Events from the year 1893 in Sweden

Incumbents
 Monarch – Oscar II
 Prime Minister – Erik Gustaf Boström.

Events

 Inauguration of the Grand Hotel Saltsjöbaden.
 19 April - Sundbybergs IK is formed.
 3 December: The Church of Sweden Oscar Fredrik Church is inaugurated on First Advent Sunday.

Births

 23 January – Sven-Olof Jonsson, gymnast (died 1945).
 24 January – Erik Friborg, cyclist (died 1968).
 7 June – Gillis Grafström, figure skater (died 1938).
 23 July – Gerda Höjer, nurse and politician (died 1974)
 21 October – Fabian Biörck, gymnast (died 1977).

Deaths

  4 December - Maria Westberg, ballerina (born 1853)
 Anna Christina Cronquist, entrepreneur and weaver (born 1807)

References

 
Sweden
Years of the 19th century in Sweden